Margaret Price or Maggie Price may refer to:

People
Margaret Price (1941–2011), Welsh operatic soprano
Margaret Evans Price (1888–1973), co-founder of Fisher-Price Toys
Maggie Price (writer), co-author of Crimes of Passion (2002) with B. J. Daniels
Margaret Price, disability studies scholar; see Bodymind

Other
Margaret Price, a character in the 1938 U.S. film Air Devils  
Maggie Price, a character in the TV horror series Monsters